Kosmonavt Yuriy Gagarin was a Soviet space control-monitoring ship or Vigilship (Veladora) that was devoted to detecting and receiving satellite communications. Named after cosmonaut Yuri Gagarin, the ship was completed in December 1971 to support the Soviet space program. The ship also conducted upper atmosphere and outer space research.

It had very distinguishable looks due to two extremely large and two smaller parabolic "dish" antennas placed on top of the hull.

In 1986, Kosmonavt Yuriy Gagarin was the world's largest communications ship and was the flagship of a fleet of communications ships. These ships greatly extended the tracking range when the orbits of cosmonauts and unmanned missions were not over the USSR.

In 1975, the ship was a part of the Soviet-American Apollo–Soyuz joint test program.

The communications ships belonged to the Soviet Academy of Sciences. The maritime part fell under the responsibility of the Baltic- and Black sea shipping. The ships had home ports in Ukraine (Kosmonavt Yuriy Gagarin and the other surveillance ship ), so after the fall of the Soviet Union they were transferred to Ukraine – ending their role in spaceflight.

The ship was sold for scrap shortly after the break-up of the Soviet Union along with Akademik Sergei Korolev.

See also 
 , another Soviet satellite tracking ship
 List of ships of Russia by project number

References

External links 
 A. Karpenko, ABM and Space Defense, Nevsky Bastion, No. 4, 1999, pp. 2–47, Federation of American Scientists (Online)

Auxiliary ships of the Soviet Navy
Maritime vessels related to spaceflight
Ships of the Soviet space program
Ships built in the Soviet Union
Monuments and memorials to Yuri Gagarin
Ships built at the Baltic Shipyard